México >> Madrid: En Directo y Sin Escalas is the fourteenth album recorded by Mexican singer Alejandro Fernández, a concert made on June 22, 2005, in "El Nuevo Palacio de Congresos" in Madrid, Spain. A spectacular production that counted on the participation of more than 28 musicians in which Alejandro interpreted his biggest successes. Some of the most outstanding moments were the duets with Amaia Montero (from La Oreja de Van Gogh), the Spanish singer Malú and Diego "El Cigala". In words of the same Alejandro: "An unforgettable, very intimate, magical and special concert".

Track listing

CD 
 Obertura/ Canta corazón (Gian Marco) – 5:06
 Abrázame (Rafael Ferro García, Julio Iglesias) – 5:23
 Me dediqué a perderte (dueto con Amaia) (Leonel García) – 4:08
 Popurrí Juan Gabriel (Juan Gabriel) – 8:04
 Todo (Leonel García) – 3:39
 Tantita pena (Kiko Campos, Fernando Riba) – 4:58
 Como yo te amé (Armando Manzanero) – 3:54
 Contigo aprendí (dueto con Malú) (Armando Manzanero) – 5:14
 Qué voy a hacer con mi amor (Luis Carlos Monroy, Raúl Ornelas) – 5:04
 Como quien pierde una estrella (dueto con Diego "El Cigala") (Humberto Estrada) – 5:46
 El rey (José Alfredo Jiménez) – 2:40
 México lindo y querido (Chucho Monge) – 4:05
 Para vivir (Versión Acústica) (Kike Santander) – 4:53

DVD 
 Obertura/ Canta corazón
 Abrázame
 Me dediqué a perderte (dueto con Amaia)
 Popurrí Juan Gabriel
 Todo
 Tantita pena
 Como yo te amé
 Contigo aprendí (dueto con Malú)
 Granada
 Qué voy a hacer con mi amor
 Como quien pierde una estrella (dueto con Diego "El Cigala")
 El rey
 México lindo y querido

Charts

Album

Singles

Sales and certifications

References

Alejandro Fernández live albums
2005 live albums
2005 video albums
Live video albums
Spanish-language live albums